Thomas J. Murphy (May 3, 1937 – August 29, 2018) was a Canadian politician from Newfoundland. He represented St. John's South in the Newfoundland House of Assembly from 1989 to 1996.

The son of Richard Murphy, he was born in St. John's and was educated at Saint Mary's University. In 1981, Murphy married Gloria Grimes. Murphy was president of the Canadian Society of Safety Engineering.

Murphy was elected to the Newfoundland assembly in 1989, winning by only two votes; he was reelected in 1993. He was defeated by Tom Osborne when he ran for reelection in 1996.

References 

1937 births
2018 deaths
Liberal Party of Newfoundland and Labrador
Politicians from St. John's, Newfoundland and Labrador